CILO-FM is a low-power commercial multilingual radio station which operates at 102.9 MHz (FM) in Montreal, Quebec, Canada. The station is owned and operated by AGNI Communications Inc., which received approval from the CRTC on May 16, 2014.  The station will broadcast with an average effective radiated power (ERP) of 31 watts (maximum ERP of 50 watts with a directional antenna and an effective height of antenna above average terrain of 44.4 metres; 145') from facilities near the intersection of Chabanel and Jean Pratt Streets (near the intersection of A-15 and A-40) in the Ahuntsic-Cartierville borough of Montreal. Its signal is hard to receive throughout all the Greater Montreal Area as it has strong interferences with CFOI-FM's 102.9 signal which is broadcast from Saint-Jérôme at 200 watts, it can only be heard clearly in the Villeray-Saint-Michel-Parc-Extension area and Ahunstic-Cartierville as well.

CILO-FM will focus on the South Asian diaspora community in Montreal, with most of its programs in Tamil.

References

External links
CILO-FM history - Canadian Communication Foundation

Asian-Canadian culture in Montreal
Ilo-Fm
Ilo-Fm
Ilo-Fm
Tamil-Canadian culture
South Asian Canadian culture